DWSS (1494 AM) is a radio station owned and operated by Supreme Broadcasting System, a subsidiary of FBS Radio Network in the Philippines. The station's studio is located at Paragon Plaza Condominium, EDSA corner Reliance St., Mandaluyong, while its transmitter is located along Coloong 1 Rd., Brgy. Caloong, Valenzuela City (co-shared with sister station DWBL).

Profile
The station was established by Masscom Network of the National Council of Churches in the Philippines in 1975 as DWEE. Back then, it was situated on 1380 kHz. On November 1978, it transferred to 1494 kHz due to the adoption of the 9-kHz spacing for medium wave stations per the Geneva Frequency Plan of 1975 (aka GE75), and changed its call letters to DWXY. Sometime in 1980, it was acquired by RADIO Inc. (Radio Corporation of the Philippines) and changed its call letters to DWCJ. The station was located at the now Philippine Christian University campus in Taft Ave., Manila. The station then aired the programs similar to the past KZKZ.

In 1988, Ultrasonic Broadcasting System bought the station and changed its call letters to DWLR. It relocated to SYSU Bldg. in Quezon City. In 1993, it changed its call letters to DWSS, airing Christian music under the name 1494 K-LOVE. Considering the owner's strong family religious background, this was their 1st venture into religious programming, way before Saved began airing on Energy FM years later. In 1996, Manny Luzon took over the station's operations and revamped DWSS as a blocktime station, carrying the tagline Sandigan ng Sambayanan.

In 2004, it was sold to FBS Radio Network, in exchange of the latter's stations in Dagupan and Cebu. Due to ownership restrictions, FBS uses the franchise of Supreme Broadcasting System for DWSS. It relocated to its current home in Paragon Plaza in Mandaluyong. It was once home of Nar Pineda, Ducky Paredes, Ruben Ilagan and other Powerhouse Broadcasters since the demise of DZXQ in March 2011, as well as the Tagalog-languaged broadcast of Family Radio during evenings.

References

External links
Old Website

FBS Radio Network
DWSS
Radio stations established in 1975